Scott Andrew Kopel (born 25 February 1970 in Blackburn) is a Scottish footballer who plays as a defender.

Kopel, son of former Manchester United, Blackburn Rovers and Dundee United player Frank, began his career with Dundee United but made just one appearance, playing as a right-back in the 2–2 draw at home to Icelandic side FH in the 1990-91 UEFA Cup first round. Kopel failed to appear in another matchday squad and played a game for Chesterfield on a non-contract basis before joining Brechin City in 1993. Playing just four league matches for Brechin, Kopel moved on to Forfar Athletic and became more of a regular, playing nearly forty league games in two seasons, scoring seven goals. Following his departure in 1995, Kopel moved to junior side Dundee St Joseph's and later played in the 2001 Scottish Junior Cup Final for Carnoustie Panmure.

Kopel was appointed assistant manager at Montrose in January 2006 but left the club by the end of the season.

References

External links 
 Independent profile

1970 births
Brechin City F.C. players
Carnoustie Panmure F.C. players
Chesterfield F.C. players
Dundee United F.C. players
English footballers
Forfar Athletic F.C. players
Living people
Scottish Football League players
English Football League players
Association football midfielders
People from Blackburn
English people of Scottish descent